Marianne Bengtsson (1937–2005) was a Swedish film actress. She enjoyed a brief career as a star in the 1950s before marrying a journalist and retiring from acting. She appeared in eight films during her career, usually in leading roles.

Filmography
 Men in the Dark (1955)
 The Girl in the Rain (1955)
 The Stranger from the Sky (1956)
 The Song of the Scarlet Flower (1956)
 The Biscuit (1956)
 Night Light (1957)
 The Great Amateur (1958)
 Only a Waiter (1959)

References

Bibliography
 Gustafsson, Fredrik. The Man from the Third Row: Hasse Ekman, Swedish Cinema and the Long Shadow of Ingmar Bergman. Berghahn Books, 2016.
 Qvist, Per Olov & von Bagh, Peter. Guide to the Cinema of Sweden and Finland. Greenwood Publishing Group, 2000.

External links

1937 births
2005 deaths
Swedish film actresses
20th-century Swedish actresses

sv:Marianne Bengtsson